Sikkikede  (also known as Ndah), also spelled Sikikédé, is a town in Vakaga Prefecture, Central African Republic. It is the largest settlement in Vakaga, with a population of around 20.000 people, and home to a rebel group, CPJP.

History 
Together with Mélé, a clash took place in Sikkikede between UFDR and CPJP on 10 April 2011. Responding to this clash, the villagers fled to Chad and Tiringoulou.

In 2012, Sikkikede faced a food crisis. Of 1332 children that were screened by International Medical Corps’ nutrition, 21% of the children suffered from global acute malnutrition and 7% had severe acute malnutrition.

Central African Republic Civil War (2012-present) 

On March 2022, there was a clash between FPRC, RPRC and MLCJ and Wagner Group. The clash led to the death of 20 people, and some shops and houses were burned.

On 28 January 2023, the rebel withdrew from Sikkide and FACA and Wagner Group captured the town after a clash in Gounda. They carried out door-to-door searches to find the rebels. They did not find them. On 14 February 2023, CPC rebels attacked Sikkikede. Clash happened for two hours, and CPC captured the town. The government lost about 15 soldiers and the rebels captured 20. Responding to the CPC's attack, most of the residents fled to the bush while others, mostly women and children, went to Mélé.

On 23 February 2023, the government forces assisted by Wagner Group recaptured Sikkikede from CPC rebels.

Demographics 
Runga makes up the majority of the Sikkikede population.

References 

Populated places in Vakaga